William Smyth (c. 1460–1514) was an English bishop.

William Smyth may also refer to:

Politics
 Sir William Smyth, 1st Baronet (c.1616–1696), English politician
 William Smyth (Irish politician), UK MP for the Irish constituency of Westmeath, 1801–1808
 William Smyth (congressman) (1824–1870), American politician
 William Smyth (Australian politician) (1846–1899), Australian politician for electoral district of Gympie
 William Ross Smyth (1857–1932), Canadian politician
 William James Smyth (1886–1950), labour member of the Senate of Northern Ireland

Sports
 Bill Smyth (broadcaster) (1936–2011), broadcaster and sports journalist in Northern Ireland
 Bill Smyth (umpire) (1916–2007), Australian cricket umpire
 Billy Smyth (1925–2005), Northern Irish footballer
 Bill Smyth (American football) (1922–1966), American football player

Religion
 William Smyth (English bishop) (1858-1950), better known as Edmund Smyth, Anglican bishop in England and South Africa
 William Smyth (Irish bishop) (1642–1705), Anglican bishop in Ireland
 William Blood Smyth, Archdeacon of Killaloe, 1927–1938
 William Smyth (priest, born 1683) (1683–1759), Dean of Ardfert and Archdeacon of Meath
William Smyth (priest, born 1662) (1662-1710), Irish Anglican priest, Archdeacon of Connor

Other
 William Smyth (architect) (died 1490), English Gothic architect
 William Smyth (academic administrator) (1582–1658), English academic administrator at the University of Oxford
 William Smyth (historian) (1765–1849), English historian
 William Henry Smyth (1788–1865), British astronomer and admiral
 William Smyth (professor) (1797–1868), American mathematician

See also
 William Smythe (disambiguation)
 William Smith (disambiguation)